The Saline County Bank is a historic building in Western, Nebraska, and its current post office. It was built in 1887 to house the Saline County Bank, who president was George F. Sawyer. It was designed in the Italianate architectural style. The initially belonged to William Bench, and it was acquired by Sawyer in 1889, followed by the bank itself in 1896. It later became Western's post office. It has been listed on the National Register of Historic Places since April 5, 1990.

References

National Register of Historic Places in Saline County, Nebraska
Italianate architecture in Nebraska
Commercial buildings completed in 1887
Bank buildings on the National Register of Historic Places in Nebraska
Post office buildings on the National Register of Historic Places in Nebraska